Rodney Dean Curl (born January 9, 1943) is an American professional golfer best known for being the first full-blooded Native American to win a PGA Tour event.

Born in Redding, California, Curl is a Wintu Indian. Before taking up golf at age 19, he was an outstanding baseball player at Central Valley High School in Shasta County, California.

Curl joined the PGA Tour in 1969 and played regularly through 1978. He had 42 top-10 finishes in official PGA Tour events including one win and a half-dozen second and third-place finishes. In 1974, he won the Colonial National Invitation in Fort Worth by one stroke after runner-up Jack Nicklaus bogeyed the 17th hole and a birdied the last.

Curl played in a limited number of Senior Tour events after reaching the age of 50 in 1993. He lives in Jupiter, Florida and is a corporate instructor with VIP Golf Academy.

Personal
Curl has two sons who are professional golfers: Rod Curl, Jr. is a club pro in Florida and Jeff Curl played on the Nationwide Tour. Rod also has a daughter, Kayla Curl who resides in Georgia.

Professional wins (2)

PGA Tour wins (1)

Other wins (1) 
1977 World Indian Open

See also
Spring 1969 PGA Tour Qualifying School graduates
1985 PGA Tour Qualifying School graduates

References

External links

Database Golf – Rod Curl
California Indian Education – Sports heroes – Rod Curl

American male golfers
PGA Tour golfers
Golfers from California
Golfers from Florida
Native American sportspeople
People from Redding, California
People from Jupiter, Florida
Wintun
1943 births
Living people